Christof Frommelt (29 June 1918 – 16 March 1987) was a Liechtensteiner cross-country skier. He competed in the men's 18 kilometre event at the 1948 Winter Olympics. He was the father of the Alpine skiers Willi Frommelt and Paul Frommelt.

References

1918 births
1987 deaths
Liechtenstein male cross-country skiers
Olympic cross-country skiers of Liechtenstein
Cross-country skiers at the 1948 Winter Olympics
Place of birth missing